The Doyang–Dhansiri Valley is an ancient archaeological site in the southern part of Assam and the south western part of Nagaland which is home to the rivers Dhansiri and its tributary, the Chathe and Doyang. The stretch of land is located in the middle of 25-26.8 E and 93-94.5 N where it is almost fully surrounded by hills with the north being an exception as it expands into the Assam Valley. The valley is widely gaining attention of archaeologists for its artefacts which are contributors to the study of ancient Assam and their rulers, religions, and cultures, specifically in the time period of 2nd century A.D. to 18th century A.D.

References

Bibliography 

Archaeological sites in India
Geography of Assam